"Last Day of My Life" is a song co-written and recorded by American country music singer Phil Vassar. It was released in February 2006 as the first single from his compilation album Greatest Hits, Vol. 1, and Vassar's twelfth chart single overall.  The song reached a peak of number 2 on the Billboard Hot Country Songs charts.  It was written by Vassar and Tim Ryan.

Content
"Last Day of My Life" was co-written by Vassar and former solo artist Tim Ryan. It is a ballad in which the narrator realizes that he is not spending enough time with his family and friends; he comes to this realization after attending a friend's funeral. Vassar was inspired to write the song after attending the funeral of his friend Robert Byrne, with whom he co-wrote his 2001 single "Rose Bouquet".) In the chorus, the singer vows to show more affection towards his wife, and love her like "it's the last day of [his] life".

After being asked whether the song was meant to be a life lesson, or a ballad about love-making, Vassar replied:

Music video
A music video for the song debuted on CMT (Country Music Television) and GAC (Great American Country), the two major country music television networks, on April 1, 2006. Directed by Roman White, it features Vassar performing behind a greenscreen onto which animation is projected.

Chart performance

Year-end charts

References

2006 singles
2006 songs
Phil Vassar songs
Songs written by Phil Vassar
Song recordings produced by Frank Rogers (record producer)
Music videos directed by Roman White
Arista Nashville singles
Songs written by Tim Ryan Rouillier